Route 63 is a  state highway in Massachusetts, United States, running from Route 116 in Amherst north to the New Hampshire state line in Northfield, where it continues as New Hampshire Route 63. Along the way it intersects several major highways including Route 2 in Erving and Route 10 in Northfield.

Route description
Route 63 begins at Route 116 at the north end of the UMass Amherst campus.  It heads eastward for a third of a mile before turning onto Sunderland Road (the old alignment of Route 116) for fifty yards, before turning onto Montague Road.  Montague Road passes through the western side of the town of Leverett, crossing the New England Central Railroad tracks before entering Sunderland for a short distance, crossing the tracks again before entering Montague.  It meets the northern end of Route 47 south of Montague Center before passing Lake Pleasant and crossing the tracks twice more before crossing the Millers River at Millers Falls, entering the town of Erving.  

In Erving, Route 63 passes under Route 2 (the Mohawk Trail) without direct access between the two.  Signage on both roads directs traffic along Prospect Street (signed as "To 2 East" and "To 63 South") and along Forest Street (signed as "To 2 East" and "To 63 North"). Route 63 then heads north into Northfield, passing Northfield Mountain. It joins Route 10 (just east of Bennett's Meadow Bridge over the Connecticut River) for just under , before splitting just south of the New Hampshire state line. It shortly turns northwestward before entering the town of Hinsdale and becoming New Hampshire Route 63.

History
Route 63 was defined by 1929, running from Route 116 in Sunderland north along current Route 47 into Montague, and then along Sunderland Road, Turners Falls Road and Montague Road towards Turners Falls. South of Turners Falls, it turned east and merged with Route 2 (later Route 2A), which it took to Millers Falls. There it turned north onto its present alignment, ending at Route 10 in Northfield.

Ca. 1939, Route 63 was extended south from Sunderland along present Route 47, ending at Route 116 in South Hadley. Around the same time, it was shifted to its current alignment from south of Montague center (where Route 47 now cuts over to Route 63) north to Millers Falls. Finally, also around 1939, New Hampshire Route 10 was shifted onto a shorter route near the state line, resulting in a different crossing of the state line. The former Route 10 became New Hampshire Route 63, and Route 63 was extended north concurrent with Route 10, splitting near the state line along old Route 10.

In the late 1940s, Route 63 was shifted east from south of Montague center south to a new terminus at Route 116 in Amherst; the old route became Route 47. Finally, a new alignment of Route 116 west of Amherst center was built in 1958, and Route 63 was extended slightly west at its south end to the bypass.

Major intersections

References

063